"Heartbreaking: The Worst Person You Know Just Made A Great Point" is a satirical article by ClickHole which was published in February 2018. The article, describing a hated coworker making a logical argument during a political debate, is an Internet meme describing otherwise disliked figures making a statement the user agrees with, such as Donald Trump, David Portnoy or Mo Brooks.

The article was illustrated with a stock photo of Josep Maria García. The picture was taken in 2014 during a work trip to Barcelona, during which García was helping his photographer brother-in-law to set up the lighting for a photoshoot. The Guardian compared García to András Arató, who also unintentionally became the subject of an Internet meme in Hide the Pain Harold.

See also 
 List of Internet phenomena
 "No Way to Prevent This", Says Only Nation Where This Regularly Happens
 The Worst Person in the World (disambiguation)

References

External links 
 Heartbreaking: The Worst Person You Know Just Made A Great Point by ClickHole
  Worst Person You Know Made a Great Point on Know Your Meme

Internet memes
Internet culture
2010s photographs
Headlines
Stock photography
The Onion
2018 works